is an anime series produced by Bridge based on the gag manga series by Norio Sakurai. It centres on a class of sixth grade students, the most notorious of which are the Marui triplets; Mitsuba, Futaba and Hitoha. The first season aired on Chubu-Nippon Broadcasting between July 2, 2010 and September 26, 2010. Others broadcast networks are BS11 Digital, AT-X, MBS and Tokyo MX.  New episodes are currently being subtitled by MX International and simulcast on Crunchyroll. The series began release on Blu-ray and DVD from August 25, 2010. An additional episode was included with the seventh volume released on February 23, 2011, also airing on March 6, 2011 following the second season. A second season of the anime, titled  was announced with the 10th volume of the manga and aired between January 8, 2011 and February 28, 2011, also being simulcast on Crunchyroll.

The first season use two pieces of theme music, one opening and one ending theme. The second season uses five pieces of theme music, two opening themes and three ending themes. The ending theme for episode 4 is "Nearer, My God, to Thee" performed by Takagaki, Akesaka and Tomatsu.

Episode list

Mitsudomoe (2010)

Mitsudomoe Zōryōchū! (2011)

References

Mitsudomoe